The 1957 Detroit Titans football team represented the University of Detroit as an independent during the 1957 NCAA University Division football season. Detroit outscored its opponents by a combined total of 179 to 98 and finished with a 6–3 record in its fourth year under head coach Wally Fromhart.

The team's statistical leaders included Lou Faoro with 545 passing yards, Billy Russell with 431 rushing yards, and Albert Korpak with 266 receiving yards and 48 points scored.

Schedule

References

External links
 1957 University of Detroit football programs

Detroit
Detroit Titans football seasons
Detroit Titans football
Detroit Titans football